Keller Lake is a surface water body in the Northwest Territories of Canada.

There is a salmonid population in Keller Lake. On some of the plains surrounding Keller Lake, climax polygonal bogs have formed, the early successional stage to which often consists of pioneer Black Spruce.

See also
 List of rivers of the Northwest Territories

Notes

References
 Bryan Robert Davies and Keith F. Walker. 1986. The Ecology of River Systems, Published by Springer, 793 pages
 C. Michael Hogan. 2008. Black Spruce: Picea mariana, GlobalTwitcher.com, ed. Nicklas Stromberg

Lakes of the Northwest Territories